Eagle Ridge High School is a charter school in Klamath Falls, Oregon

References

Charter schools in Oregon
High schools in Klamath County, Oregon
Klamath Falls, Oregon
Public high schools in Oregon